The following is a list of events in the year 1964 in Bolivia.

Incumbents 
 President:
 Víctor Paz Estenssoro (until 4 November)
 President of the Military Government Junta:
 Alfredo Ovando Candía (5 November)
 René Barrientos (starting 5 November)
 Vice President:
 Juan Lechín (until 6 August)
 René Barrientos (6 August – 4 November)
 Vacant (starting 4 November)

Ongoing events 
 Bolivian National Revolution (1952–1964)

Events 
 31 May – General elections are held. President Paz Estenssoro is reelected two a second consecutive and third overall term.
 6 August – Paz Estenssoro and Barrientos are sworn in as president and vice president, respectively.
 4 November – President Paz Estenssoro is ousted in a coup d'état led by Vice President Barrientos and General Ovando Candía.
 5 November – Both Barrientos and Ovando Candía are sworn in as co-chairmen of junta, but the latter is forced to resign an hour later.

Births 
 12 December – Elizabeth Salguero, diplomat, journalist, politician, and women's rights activist.

Deaths 
 8 June – Carlos Quintanilla, 76, 37th president of Bolivia (b. 1888)

References

Footnotes

Bibliography 

 

1964 in Bolivia
Bolivia
Years of the 20th century in Bolivia